Chicago 13 is the eleventh studio album by the American band Chicago, released in 1979, the follow-up to Hot Streets. Chicago 13 was the band's final release featuring lead guitarist Donnie Dacus, who had followed the late founding member, guitarist Terry Kath. All band members contributed to the songwriting (one of only two albums where this is the case, the other being Chicago VII).

Background
After recording sessions in Morin-Heights, Quebec and Hollywood, Chicago 13—which saw the band return to numbering its albums and displaying its logo—was released in August 1979, and was preceded by Donnie Dacus's "Must Have Been Crazy" as lead single. Chicago 13 is the first Chicago album to bear no significant hit singles.

Despite negative reviews, Chicago 13 reached No. 21 and went gold, although it was the band's first album to miss the Top 20 and was then the lowest charting release since their debut album. Shortly after the tour to support the album ended, Dacus was fired from the band without explanation.

In 2003, Chicago 13 was remastered and reissued by Rhino Records with a B-Side, featuring Dacus's "Closer to You" (an outtake from the Hot Streets sessions), and the 12-inch single mix of "Street Player" as bonus tracks. 

The opening track, the disco-fueled extended jam "Street Player" was also released as a single and hit the R&B singles chart on 12/1/1979 at 91 on the charts. The songs "Street Player" and "Closer to You" had previously been released by other artists: "Street Player" by Rufus, who recorded it before Chicago, and "Closer" by Stephen Stills, though with Donnie Dacus on lead vocals. "Street Player" did eventually reach hit status, being sampled for the 1995 hit "The Bomb! (These Sounds Fall into My Mind)" by The Bucketheads, the 2009 hit "I Know You Want Me (Calle Ocho)" by Pitbull and the 2013 remix by dance music producer "Tradelove".

Track listing

Personnel

Chicago 
 Peter Cetera – bass, lead and backing vocals
 Donnie Dacus – guitars, lead and backing vocals
 Laudir de Oliveira – percussion
 Robert Lamm – keyboards, lead and backing vocals
 Lee Loughnane – trumpet, backing vocals
 James Pankow – trombone, brass arrangements
 Walter Parazaider – woodwinds
 Danny Seraphine – drums

Additional personnel 
 P.C. Moblee – lead vocals on "Window Dreamin'" and "Aloha Mama" (Moblee was actually Peter Cetera singing in a lower register. His appearance on the album is credited as "courtesy of the Peter Cetera Vocal Company").
 David "Hawk" Wolinski – synthesizer on "Street Player"
 Airto Moreira – percussion on "Street Player", "Paradise Alley", "Life Is What It Is" and "Run Away"
 Maynard Ferguson – trumpet soloist on "Street Player"

Production 
 Produced by Phil Ramone and Chicago
 Production Assistant – Michele Slagter
 Engineered and Mixed by Jim Boyer
 Assistant Engineers – Nick Blagona, Roger Ginsley, John Beverly Jones, Bradshaw Leigh, Peter Lewis and Robbie Whelan.
 Mastered by Ted Jensen at Sterling Sound (New York City, NY).
 Cover Design Concept – Tony Lane
 Logo Design – Nick Fasciano
 Back Cover and Sleeve Photography – Gary Heery

Charts

References

1979 albums
Chicago (band) albums
Columbia Records albums
Albums produced by Phil Ramone
Albums recorded at A&M Studios
Albums recorded at Le Studio